John Butler, Earl of Gowran (1643–1677) was an MP in the Irish Parliament 1661–1666 before being created Earl of Gowran in 1676.

Birth and origins 
John was born in 1643 in Dublin, the sixth child of James Butler and his wife Elizabeth Preston. At the time his father was the 1st Marquess of Ormond but he would later become the 1st Duke. His father's family, the Butler dynasty, was Old English and descended from Theobald Walter, who had been appointed Chief Butler of Ireland by King Henry II in 1177.

John's mother was his father's second cousin once removed. She was a rich heiress, the only child of Richard Preston, 1st Earl of Desmond. His parents had married on Christmas Day 1629. John was one of 10 siblings, but five died in childhood. The surviving children are listed in his father's article.

Early years 
John was born in Dublin where his mother had rejoined his father in 1642 after the Confederates allowed her to leave Kilkenny Castle. In 1647 he was then taken by his parents to England when his father handed Dublin over to the Parliamentarians. In 1648 his mother took him and his siblings to Caen in Normandy, France, while his father stayed somewhat longer in England. His father then also fled to France and was employed by the king in Paris and on international missions. In 1652 the family in Caen ran out of money and his mother went with the children to London and obtained some help from Cromwell. In 1655 she moved to Ireland and lived with her children at Dunmore near Kilkenny. At the restoration, their father rejoined them in Ireland.

In parliament 
On 20 August 1662, during the Irish Parliament (1661–1666), the only one held in the reign of Charles II (1660–1685), John replaced his brother Thomas as the member (MP) for Trinity College as Thomas had been summoned to the House of Lords by a writ of acceleration as Earl of Ossory and could therefore not sit any more in the House of Commons.

Marriage 
In January 1674 John married Lady Anne Chichester, only daughter of Arthur Chichester, 1st Earl of Donegall. His marriage stayed childless.

Later life 
On 13 April 1676, John was created Baron Aghrim, Viscount Clonmore, and Earl of Gowran, all in the Peerage of Ireland.

Death 
Gowran, as he now was, travelled to Paris for the recovery of his health but died there in August 1677, aged about 34. 

He left no issue and his titles died with him.

Notes and references

Notes

Citations

Sources 

 
 
  – 1643 to 1660
  – G to K (for Gowran)
  – N to R (for Ormond)
  – England
 
 
  – Viscounts (for Mountgarrett)
  (for his mother)

1643 births
1677 deaths
John
Earls in the Peerage of Ireland
Peers of Ireland created by Charles II
Butler, John
Butler, John
Butler, John